Alfa Romeo 350 is a medium Italian truck produced by Alfa Romeo in its Portello Plant. It was made after the 85 and 110 proved to be too heavy and expensive.

Technical characteristics
Had place for 2 people in the cabin.

History
Like the models already in production at Portello, the 350 was also based on German Büssing model, the 275 type: the development began in 1934 and compared to the original version the engine was upgraded and revised chassis and brakes. The production ceased in 1937, with the introduction of the 500, evolution of the 350 studied for the service in Italian East Africa. The 350 was right hand drive model like all trucks built in Italy until 1974.

A total of 701 350 were produced, including the bus version.

References

Bibliografia
 Stefano Salvetti, L'altra Alfa, Fucina Editore, Milano, 2014, 

Alfa Romeo trucks
Vehicles introduced in 1935